Jonathan Nez (born May 26, 1975) is a Navajo politician who served as the 9th President of the Navajo Nation from 2019 to 2023. He previously served as Vice President and as a Navajo Nation Council delegate.

Earlier in his career, Jonathan Nez served as a council delegate representing Tsah Bii Kin, Navajo Mountain, Shonto, & Oljato Chapters.

Early life and education 
Nez was born in Tuba City, Arizona, and attended Northland Pioneer College and Northern Arizona University (NAU). He attained both a Bachelor of Science in political science and a Master of Public Administration from NAU.

Early political career 

Earlier in his career, Nez served as vice president of the Navajo Nation's Shonto chapter. He also served as a delegate to the Navajo Nation Council, where he represented the Oljato, Ts'ah Bii' Kin, Navajo Mountain, and Shonto chapters. 

In 2015, he was elected Vice President of the Navajo Nation in a ticket led by Russell Begaye. He was formally sworn into office on May 12, 2015.

President of the Navajo Nation (2019–2023) 
On November 6, 2018, Nez was elected President of the Navajo Nation by a margin of 33.07% of the vote versus former President Joe Shirley Jr. Shirley had received the endorsement of Begaye and also boasted high name recognition owing to his former tenure.

As president, Nez oversaw the Navajo Nation's response to the COVID-19 pandemic. By September 2021, the Navajo Nation's COVID-19 vaccination rate was higher than in most other parts of Arizona.

Nez unsuccessfully campaigned for reelection in 2022, losing to challenger Buu Nygren. During the campaign, Nez endorsed the legalization of same-sex marriage on the Navajo Nation.

U.S. national politics 
Nez was an early primary supporter of Hillary Clinton's 2016 presidential campaign and served on the Hillary for America Arizona Leadership Council.

Nez was selected as one of seventeen speakers to jointly deliver the keynote address at the 2020 Democratic National Convention. He was one of the electors for Arizona in 2020 for the presidential election.

2022 vehicle ramming incident 
Nez and his family were nearly struck when an SUV drove through a parade in Gallup, New Mexico. In total, fifteen people were left injured. Nez later reflected on the event saying "You would think it would never happen here. I’m sorry to say it happened here in Gallup, New Mexico." and "it was a difficult time for us".

References

External links

 Navajo Nation Office of the President and Vice President

|-

1975 births
2020 United States presidential electors
20th-century Native Americans
21st-century Native Americans
Arizona Democrats
Living people
Native American people from Arizona
Northern Arizona University alumni
People from Tuba City, Arizona
Presidents of the Navajo Nation
Vice Presidents of the Navajo Nation